Audra is an English feminine given name. Notable people with the name include:
 
Audra Cohen (born 1986), an American professional tennis player from Plantation, Florida
Audra Dagelytė (born 1981), a Lithuanian sprinter who mostly competed at 100 m and 200 m running events
Audra Levi (born 1974), an American actress, singer, producer and writer
Audra Lindley (1918–1997), an American actress, most famous for her role as landlady Helen Roper on the sitcom Three's Company
Audra Lynn (born 1980) an American model and television guest star who was Playboy magazine's Playmate of the Month for October 2003
Audra Mae (born 1985), an American singer-songwriter from Oklahoma City, Oklahoma and the grandniece of Judy Garland
Audra Mari (born 1994), an American model and television host who was crowned Miss World America 2016
Audra McDonald (born 1970), an American singer and actress who has appeared in plays, television and films
Audra Smith (born 1970), the head women's basketball coach at South Carolina State University
Audra Strickland (born 1974), a Republican politician who was a member of the California State Assembly for the 37th district from 2004 to 2010
Audra Thomas, a Northern Irish television presenter who is currently a continuity announcer and newsreader on UTV

See also

Audra (disambiguation)

Feminine given names
English-language feminine given names
English feminine given names